Nawada Assembly constituency is one of the 243 vidhan sabha constituencies of legislative assembly of Bihar, India. It is a part of Nawada lok sabha constituency.

Members of Legislative Assembly

Election results

2020

References

External links
 

Politics of Nawada district
Assembly constituencies of Bihar